Ludwik Władysław Franciszek Kondratowicz (29 September 1823 – 15 September 1862), better known as Władysław Syrokomla, was a Polish romantic poet, writer and translator working in Vilnius and Vilna Governorate, then Russian Empire.

Biography
Syrokomla was born on 29 September 1823 in the village of Smolków, in the Minsk Governorate of the Russian Empire (now Smolhava, Minsk Region, Belarus), to an impoverished noble family. His parents were Aleksander Kajetan Kondratowicz (d. 1858) and Wiktoria (née Złotkowska). His uncle was Hilary Kondratowicz (1790–1823), a Polish teacher of maths in gymnasium in Vilnius, who published some articles in Wiadomości Brukowe. A year after his birth his parents moved to another village (Jaśkowicze). In 1833 he entered the Dominican school in Nesvizh (Nieśwież). He had to give up his studies due to financial problems. In 1837 he began work in a Marchaczewszczyzna folwark. Between 1841 and 1844, he worked as a clerk in the Radziwiłł family land manager's office. On 16 April 1844 in Niaśviž he married Paulina Mitraszewska, with whom he had four children; three of them would die in the same year (1852).

In 1844 he published the first of his poems – Pocztylion – under the pen-name Władysław Syrokomla, coined after his family's coat of arms. The same year he also rented the small village of Załucze. In 1853, after the death of three of his children, he sold it or gave his manor to his parents, and settled in Vilnius itself. After a few months he rented the village of Bareikiškės, near Vilnius. He became one of the editors (1861–1862) of the Kurier Wileński, the largest and most prestigious Polish-language daily newspaper published in the Vilnius area. In 1858 he visited Kraków, and some time later he visited Warsaw. For taking part in an anti-tsarist demonstration in 1861 in Warsaw he was arrested by the Okhrana and then sentenced to home arrest in his manor in Bareikiškės. He died on 15 September 1862 and was buried in the Rasos Cemetery in Vilnius.

Throughout his life, Syrokomla would remain impoverished; Czesław Miłosz wrote that he was "forever struggling against his lack of education and his poverty". Despite that, Syrokomla had many influential and even wealthy friends; his manor was visited by count Eustachy Tyszkiewicz, Stanisław Moniuszko, Ignacy Chodźko, Mikołaj Malinowski, Antoni Pietkiewicz and others.

Works 
Syrkomla was influenced by Adam Mickiewicz. In his prose he supported the liberation of peasants and secession of the lands of former Polish–Lithuanian Commonwealth from Imperial Russia, which had annexed portions of the Commonwealth, including what was the Grand Duchy of Lithuania, during its late 18th-century partitions.

Among the most notable of Syrokomla's works are translations of various Russian, French, Ukrainian, German and Latin poets, including works by Goethe, Heine, Lermontov, Shevchenko, Nekrasov, Béranger and others. His translations are considered a "great service" for the Polish language. Syrokomla also produced a number of works about the rustic nature, people and customs of Lithuania and Belarus.

The vast majority of his works were written in the Polish language, however, he also wrote several poems in Belarusian. Syrokomla is considered by some as one of the early influential writers in modern Belarusian language, although many of his Belarusian poems are believed to be lost.

During his lifetime, his works were translated into several languages, including Lithuanian. The composer Tchaikovsky adapted one of his works expressing a sympathetic view of the then-unliberated peasants – The Coral Beads – into a song. He also wrote of the Karaite community in Lithuania and its mosques and of a Jewish bookseller in Vilnius.

Some of his works are classified as gawęda (a story-like Polish epic literary genre).

 Translations of Polish-Latin poets of Sigismund's age like Maciej Kazimierz Sarbiewski (Przekłady poetów polsko-łacińskich epoki zygmuntowskiej m.in. Macieja Kazimierza Sarbiewskiego)
 Chats and rhymes elusive (Gawędy i rymy ulotne) (1853)
 Born Jan Dęboróg (Urodzony Jan Dęboróg)
 Poetries of the last hour (Poezje ostatniej godziny)
 Liberation of peasants (Wyzwolenie włościan)
 Margier. A poem from Lithuania's history (Margier. Poemat z dziejów Litwy) (1855)
 Good Thursday (Wielki Czwartek) (1856)
 Janko the Cemetery-man (Janko Cmentarnik) (1857)
 Kasper Kaliński (1858)
 A house in the forest (Chatka w lesie) (1855–1856)
 Hrabia na Wątorach (1856)
 The magnates and the orphan (Możnowładcy i sierota) (1859)
 Politicians from the countryside (Wiejscy politycy) (1858)
 Wojnarowski
 A journey of a familiar man through his familiar land (Podróż swojaka po swojszczyźnie)
 The history of literature in Poland (Dzieje literatury w Polsce)

Legacy

While majority of sources refer to him as a "Polish poet", his legacy is best understood in the context of the multicultural Polish-Lithuanian identity. His birthplace was located within the former Grand Duchy of Lithuania, and he referred to himself as a Lithuanian when expressing own regional identity. Syrokomla also identified himself with the land of modern Belarus and its people. During Syrokomla's burial ceremony, the Lithuanian poet Edvardas Jokūbas Daukša emphasized that while Syrokomla was influenced by Polish culture, he was a Lithuanian poet, closest to Lithuania after Adam Mickiewicz. Teofil Lenartowicz wrote a memorial poem on his death referring to him as a "lirnik Litewski" (Lithuanian lyricist). His works were often translated into Lithuanian and Belarusian languages.

In modern Belarus, he is being praised for depicting the life of 19th century Belarus and for his ethnographic research of Belarusians. In his publications, Syrokomla supported the Belarusian language and the Belarusian theatre plays by the playwright Vincent Dunin-Marcinkievič.

In Belarus, there are streets named after W. Syrokomla (vulica Uladzislava Syrakomli) in Minsk, Hrodna and in smaller towns Navahrudak, Niasvizh, Pinsk, Vaukavysk, Maladzechna and Pruzhany. In Smolhava a school is named after Syrokomla.

In Warsaw's residential district Bródno (city district Warszawa-Targówek) there are two streets dedicated to the poet: Ludwik Kondratowicz St and Władysław Syrokomla St.

In Vilnius, a Polish-language school of the Polish minority in Lithuania is named after him.

See also

Romanticism in Poland

References

External links

 Patron szkoły (biography at the Vilnius High School dedicated to him)
 Irena Kardasz, Patron szkoły (biography at the Michałowo Elementary School dedicated to him, with a chronological table of his life)
 Józefa Drozdowska, Władysław Syrokomla (krótka bibliografia) (Short bio, also contains a list of further bibliographical sources)

1823 births
1862 deaths
People from Lyuban District
People from Bobruysky Uyezd
Clan of Syrokomla
Poets from the Russian Empire
Male writers from the Russian Empire
Writers from the Russian Empire
Translators from the Russian Empire
Latin–Polish translators
French–Polish translators
German–Polish translators
Russian–Polish translators
Ukrainian–Polish translators
19th-century translators from the Russian Empire
19th-century Polish poets
19th-century Belarusian poets
Belarusian male poets
Polish male poets
19th-century Polish male writers
Translators of Johann Wolfgang von Goethe
Burials at Rasos Cemetery
Polish writers in Belarusian